Pinarella is a frazione of the city of Cervia, Italy.

Gallery

Frazioni of the Province of Ravenna